Ghettoville is the fourth studio album by British electronic musician Actress. It was released on 27 January 2014 by Werkdiscs and Ninja Tune.

Track listing

Charts

References

External links 
 

2014 albums
Actress (musician) albums
Ninja Tune albums
Werk Discs albums